Thomas Alfred Jones, VC, DCM (25 December 1880 – 30 January 1956), also known as 'Todger' Jones, was an English recipient of the Victoria Cross, the highest award for gallantry in the face of the enemy awarded to British and Commonwealth forces. There is a statue of Jones at Runcorn War Memorial.

Biography

Jones was born in Runcorn, Cheshire, on 25 December (Christmas Day) 1880. He was a private in the 1st Battalion, The Cheshire Regiment, British Army during the First World War. He was known affectionately locally as 'Todger' Jones.

He was 35 years old when on 25 September 1916, during the Battle of Morval, Jones performed an act of bravery for which he was awarded the Victoria Cross. He left his trench on his own, and crossed no man's land without covering fire. Although one bullet went through his helmet and another through his coat, he returned the sniper's fire and killed him. Near the enemy trench, he saw two more Germans firing on him while simultaneously displaying a white flag. Jones shot them both. Upon reaching the enemy trench, he found several occupied dug-outs and single-handedly disarmed 102 Germans. Three or four were officers, and the entire trench was taken by Jones and his comrades.

Jones is buried in Runcorn Cemetery and his Victoria Cross medal group is displayed at the Cheshire Military Museum in Chester.

Statue

On 3 August 2014 a statue of Jones was unveiled in the Memorial Garden, Runcorn.  Following a ceremony in front of the War Memorial opposite to the garden, the statue was unveiled by four veterans and active servicemen.  It is in bronze, and was created by the Scottish sculptor David Annand.

Honours
Thomas Jones' full medal entitlement was as follows.

See also
Monuments to Courage
The Register of the Victoria Cross
VCs of the First World War - The Somme

References

Further reading
 

1880 births
1956 deaths
People from Runcorn
Cheshire Regiment soldiers
British Army personnel of World War I
British Battle of the Somme recipients of the Victoria Cross
Recipients of the Distinguished Conduct Medal
British Army recipients of the Victoria Cross
Military personnel from Cheshire